Bitoy's Showwwtime is a Philippine television talent show broadcast on GMA Network. Hosted by Michael V., it premiered on October 17, 2009. The show concluded on March 13, 2010 with a total of 22 episodes.

Hosts

 Michael V. as Mahal na Hari / Mahal na Reyna / Mahal na Kawal
 Mang Enriquez as Chester

Segments
 Talbugan
 Video Kariran
 Facemuk
 Gaya Mo 'Yun?

Ratings
According to AGB Nielsen Philippines' Mega Manila household television ratings, the pilot episode of Bitoy's Showwwtime earned a 22.3%% rating. While the final episode scored a 12% rating.

References

External links
 

2009 Philippine television series debuts
2010 Philippine television series endings
Filipino-language television shows
GMA Network original programming
Philippine reality television series